The following is a list of people associated with the former city of Königsberg (Duchy of Prussia, Kingdom of Prussia, Germany) which was renamed to Kaliningrad, Soviet Union in 1946.

Writing and public thinking 

 Stanislovas Rapalionis (14851545), at Königsberg Albertina University first translator of the Bible into Lithuanian
 Abraomas Kulvietis (15091545), religious reformer at Königsberg Albertina University
 Stanisław Murzynowski (15271553), Polish writer, translator and a Lutheran activist during the Protestant Reformation. 
 Caspar Schütz (1540 Eisleben 1594 Danzig), historian at Königsberg and Danzig, interest in the history of Prussia.
 Martynas Mažvydas (15101563), priest, writer and translator
 Jan Kochanowski (1530 in Sycyna – 1584)  Polish poet, attended the University of Königsberg after 1547 
 Simon Dach (1605 in Memel – 1659) a lyrical poet and hymnwriter.
 Frederick I of Prussia (16571713), Elector of Brandenburg & Duke of Prussia 
 John Ernest Grabe (1666–1711) an Anglican divine.
 Johann Christoph Gottsched (1700–1766) philosopher, author and critic of the Age of Enlightenment.
 Immanuel Kant (17241804), philosopher 
 Johann Georg Hamann (17301788), philosopher 
 Theodor Gottlieb von Hippel the Elder (1741–1796) a satirical and humorous writer.
 Zacharias Werner (1768–1823) a poet, dramatist and preacher. 
 E. T. A. Hoffmann (17761822), author 
 Karl Lehrs (1802–1878) a classical scholar.
 Karl Rosenkranz (1805–1879) a philosopher and pedagogue.
 Wincenty Pol (1807 in Lublin – 1872)  Polish poet; was interned in Königsberg  after the fall of the November Uprising in Russian partition of Poland. 
 Abraham Mapu (18081867), Hebrew novelist 
 Ferdinand Nesselmann  (1811 Fürstenau1881 Königsberg), mathematician, historian, orientalist and philologist
 Fanny Lewald (18111889), feminist and author 
 Theodor Goldstücker (1821–1872) a German Sanskrit scholar.
 August Wilhelm Zumpt (18151877) a German classical scholar 
 Bernhard Weiss (1827–1918) a Protestant New Testament scholar.
 Emma Goldman (18691940), author and political theorist 
 Friedrich Radszuweit (18761932), author and publisher
 Agnes Miegel (18791964), author
 Walter Liebenthal (18861982), sinologist and philosopher
 Hannah Arendt (19061975), political theorist and philosopher
 Leah Goldberg (19111970), Israeli poet
 Annemarie Bostroem (1922-2015), author
 Hans-Joachim Newiger, (1925–2011), philologist
 Leah Rabin (née Schloßberg) (19282000), author and wife of Yitzhak Rabin

Scientists 

 Johann Bartsch (17091738), physician, botanist, and collaborator with Carl Linnaeus
 Johann Christoph Bohl (1703–1785), physician, professor, and sponsor of Kant
 Karl Gottfried Hagen (17491829), chemist, opened first German chemistry lab at Königsberg's Albertina University
 Friedrich Bessel (1784–1846) an astronomer, mathematician, physicist, and geodesist.
 Johann Friedrich Dieffenbach (1792–1847), surgeon 
 Gotthilf Hagen (17971884), physicist, contributed to fluid dynamics
 Philipp Johann Ferdinand Schur (17991878) a German-Austrian pharmacist and botanist
 Adolph Eduard Grube (18121880), zoologist
 Hermann August Hagen (18171893) Cambridge, U.S., German entomologist
 Gustav Kirchhoff (18241887), physicist and spectroscopist
 Karl Rudolf König (18321901), physicist 
 Franz Ernst Christian Neumann (18341918), pathologist
 Emanuel Kayser (18451927) geologist and palaeontologist 
 Ernst Hugo Heinrich Pfitzer (18461906), botanist
 Otto Wallach (18471931), chemist, recipient of the 1910 Nobel Prize in Chemistry
 Erich von Drygalski (18651949) geographer, geophysicist and polar scientist
 Siegfried Passarge (18661958), geographer
 Arnold Sommerfeld (18681951), physicist, pioneered atomic and quantum physics
 Friedrich Adolf Paneth (18871958), chemist
 Hermann Eichhorst (18491921), physician
 Max Wien (18661938), physicist
 Fritz Albert Lipmann (18991986), biochemist, shared the 1953 Nobel Prize in Physiology or Medicine
 Arno Motulsky 1923-2018.  medical geneticist

Mathematicians

 Christian Goldbach (16901764), mathematician, developed Goldbach's conjecture
 Otto Hesse (18111874), mathematician, worked on algebraic invariants
 Carl Neumann (18321925), mathematician, worked on the Dirichlet principle
 Rudolf Lipschitz (18321903), mathematician, named the Lipschitz continuity condition
 Alfred Clebsch (18331872), mathematician, contributed to algebraic geometry
 Ludwig Scheeffer (18591885), mathematician, contributed to calculus
 Kurt Hensel (18611941) mathematician, introduced p-adic number
 David Hilbert (18621943), mathematician, developed invariant theory
 Hermann Minkowski (18641909), mathematician, developed the geometry of numbers

Arts and music 

 Anton Möller (15631611), painter active mostly in Danzig (Gdańsk)
 August Kohn (17321801/2), violinist and composer active at the courts in Berlin
 Otto Nicolai (18101849), composer and conductor 
 Rudolf Siemering (18351905) German sculptor 
 Hermann Goetz (1840–1876) a composer of the 1872 opera Der Widerspänstigen Zähmung.
 Pavel Pabst (18541897), pianist/composer and professor at the Moscow Conservatory
 Käthe Kollwitz (18671945), painter and sculptor
 Ernst Behmer (18751938) a prolific German stage and film actor 
 Werner Funck (18811951), actor, singer, and film director 
 Harry Liedtke (18821945), actor
 Heinz Tiessen (18871971), composer
 Emy von Stetten (1898–1980), soprano
 Max Colpet (19051998), popular song lyricist 
 Michael Wieck (19282021), musician and author
 Veruschka von Lehndorff (born 1939), model, actress and artist 
 Eberhard Feltz (born 1937), German classical violinist
 Wilfried Gruhn (born 1939), German violinist, musicologist, music educator and emeritus professor

Military 

 Erhard Ernst von Röder (1665–1743), Prussian field marshal
 Peter August, Duke of Schleswig-Holstein-Sonderburg-Beck (16971775) Field Marshal in the Russian Imperial Army 
 Friedrich von der Trenck (17261794), Prussian officer and adventurer.
 Leopold von Rauch (1787-1860), Prussiand general
 Prince Albert of Prussia (18091872) Generaloberst
 Max von der Goltz (1838-1906), Prussian admiral
 Ernst von Below (1863-1955), German general
 Hans Feige, (18801953), Wehrmacht general
 Oskar von Hindenburg  (18831960) a German Generalleutnant 
 Wolff von Stutterheim (18931940) a German Generalmajor
 Werner Ostendorff (19031945), German SS Major General (Gruppenführer) of the 2nd SS Panzer Division Das Reich
 Gerhard Barkhorn (19191983), second-highest-ranking Luftwaffe fighter ace (301 victories).

Politicians 

 Johann Jacoby (18051877), politician
 Eduard von Simson (18101899), jurist and politician 
 Otto Stellter (1823-1894), politician, member of German Reichstag
 Philipp, Prince of Eulenburg (1847–1921) diplomat and close friend of Wilhelm II 
 Otto Braun, (18721955), statesman and politician, Minister President of Prussia
 Carl Friedrich Goerdeler (18841945), a monarchist conservative politician
 Wilhelm von Gayl (18791945), politician of the German National People's Party
 Karl-Hermann Flach (19291973) journalist at the Frankfurter Rundschau and FDP politician

Sport 
 Eugen Sandow (18671925), first modern bodybuilder 
 Lilli Henoch (18991942), world record holder in the discus, shot put, and 4 × 100 meters relay, shot as a Jew by a  Nazi Einsatzgruppen death squad
 brothers Kraft Schepke (born 1934) & Frank Schepke (19352017) German Olympic rowers

Others 

 brothers Bruno Taut (18801938) & Max Taut (18841967), architects
 Moshe Smoira (18881961), first President of the Supreme Court of Israel
 Ehrenfried Günther Freiherr von Hünefeld (18921929) aviator, made the first east-west transatlantic flight in 1928
 Rabbi Josef Hirsch Dunner (19132007), Chief Rabbi of East Prussia 1936-1938
 Immanuel Jakobovits, Baron Jakobovits (19211999) Chief Rabbi of the United Hebrew Congregations of the Commonwealth, from 1967 to 1991
 Ulrich Schnaft (born 1923) Waffen-SS man in WWII, emigrated to Israel where he spied for Egypt
 Gerda Munsinger (19291998) an East German prostitute and alleged Soviet spy 
 Thomas Eichelbaum (19312018), former Chief Justice of New Zealand
 Heinrich August Winkler (born 1938), historian, academic and author
 Reinhard Bonnke (19402019), televangelist, missionary in Africa from 1967
 Heinrich Wilhelm Nehrenheim (18751939), military and provincial official

See also
 List of Poles from Königsberg

References

Königsberg
Konigsberg